Paulo R. Teixeira was the Director of the HIV/AIDS Department at the World Health Organization in 2003. Teixeira is the former Director of the national STD/AIDS Programme of Brazil's Ministry of Health.

References

Living people
Year of birth missing (living people)